The 1982–83 OHL season was the third season of the Ontario Hockey League. The Niagara Falls Flyers move to North Bay, Ontario, becoming the Centennials. The Guelph Platers are granted an expansion franchise. Fifteen teams each played 70 games. The Oshawa Generals won the J. Ross Robertson Cup, defeating the Sault Ste. Marie Greyhounds.

Expansion and Relocation

Guelph Platers

The Guelph Platers were approved to join the Ontario Hockey League for the 1982-83 season as the league approved an expansion team for the city of Guelph. The Platers would play in the Guelph Memorial Gardens and join the Emms Division.

The Platers previously played in the Ontario Provincial Junior A Hockey League since the 1977-78 season. The club won the 1978 Centennial Cup, defeating the Prince Albert Raiders of the Saskatchewan Junior Hockey League in a four game sweep. In the 1981-82 season, Guelph finished with a 40-4-6 record, earning 86 points and first place in the OPJHL. At the 1982 Centennial Cup, Guelph lost to Prince Albert in four games.

The Belleville Bulls, who played in the OPJHL from 1979-1981, joined the OHL one year earlier, in the 1981-82 season.

Niagara Falls Flyers to North Bay Centennials

The Niagara Falls Flyers relocated to the city of North Bay and were renamed the North Bay Centennials. The club's nickname was to commemorate the 100th anniversary of the railroad in North Bay.

The Centennials remained in the Emms Division, and would play out of the North Bay Memorial Gardens.

Regular season

Final standings
Note: GP = Games played; W = Wins; L = Losses; T = Ties; GF = Goals for; GA = Goals against; PTS = Points; x = clinched playoff berth; y = clinched first round bye; z = clinched division title & first round bye

Leyden Division

Emms Division

Scoring leaders

Playoffs

Division quarter-finals

Leyden Division

(3) Oshawa Generals vs. (6) Belleville Bulls

(4) Toronto Marlboros vs. (5) Cornwall Royals

Emms Division

(3) North Bay Centennials vs. (6) Windsor Spitfires

(4) Brantford Alexanders vs. (5) London Knights

Division semi-finals

Leyden Division

(1) Ottawa 67's vs. (5) Cornwall Royals

(2) Peterborough Petes vs. (3) Oshawa Generals

Emms Division

(1) Sault Ste. Marie Greyhounds vs. (4) Brantford Alexanders

(2) Kitchener Rangers vs. (3) North Bay Centennials

Division finals

Leyden Division

(1) Ottawa 67's vs. (3) Oshawa Generals

Emms Division

(1) Sault Ste. Marie Greyhounds vs. (2) Kitchener Rangers

J. Ross Robertson Cup

(E1) Sault Ste. Marie Greyhounds vs. (L3) Oshawa Generals

Awards

See also
List of OHA Junior A standings
List of OHL seasons
1983 Memorial Cup
1983 NHL Entry Draft
1982 in sports
1983 in sports

References

HockeyDB

Ontario Hockey League seasons
OHL